Namsan (남산, "South Mountain") is a 122-metre high hill in Haeju-si, South Hwanghae Province, North Korea.

Landforms of North Korea
Hills of Asia